The Nushagak River  is a river in southwest Alaska, United States.  It begins in the Alaska Range and flows southwest  to Nushagak Bay, an inlet of Bristol Bay, east of Dillingham, Alaska.

The Mulchatna River is a major tributary.  Other navigable tributaries include the Nuyakuk River and the King Salmon River.

Jet-boats are commonly used to access these tributaries and the upper Nushagak. The Wood River, Iowithla River and the Kokwok River are smaller tributaries.

The villages of Portage Creek, Ekwok, Koliganek and New Stuyahok are on the river.  The town of Dillingham (Pop. 2,466) is on Nushagak Bay.

The Nushagak River is downstream of the proposed Pebble Mine, whose tailings storage lake would sit at the headwaters of the Koktuli River, one of the Nushagak's tributaries.  Villages on the Nushagak are among the major opponents of the proposal.

Five species of Pacific salmon (Chinook, coho, sockeye, chum, and pink) spawn in the river or its tributaries. Commercial, subsistence and sport fishing are important in the area.  Most notable is the annual run of king (Chinook) salmon which occurs from mid-June to mid-July. Rainbow trout, northern pike, grayling, burbot, whitefish and Arctic char are also present in the Nushagak. It is estimated that over 50% of the world's production of wild salmon is harvested in the Nushagak River and the Bristol Bay area.

See also
List of Alaska rivers
List of rivers of the Americas by coastline
Nushagak, Alaska
Ekwok Community

References

External links
Photos from the Nushagak River
Pebble Mine Photos and Information
Ekwok Alaska Airport  & US Post Office on the Nushagak River

Rivers of Dillingham Census Area, Alaska
Rivers of Alaska
Rivers of Unorganized Borough, Alaska